"When I Grow Up (To Be a Man)" is a song by American rock band the Beach Boys from their 1965 album The Beach Boys Today!. Written by Brian Wilson and Mike Love, the lyrics describe a boy who is anxious of when he stops being a teenager, pondering such questions as "Will I love my wife for the rest of my life?" The song was first issued as a single, with the B-side "She Knows Me Too Well", on August 24, 1964. It peaked at number 9 in the US, number 27 in the UK, and number 1 in Canada.

It is one of the first rock songs that discussed impending adulthood and is possibly the earliest US top 40 song to contain the expression "turn on" (from the lyric "Will I dig the same things that turned me on as a kid?"). The song is also distinguished for its musical sophistication, featuring multiple key changes, a hook based on a dissonant, functionally ambiguous chord, tempo stretches, and a long pause as a climax.

Background
"When I Grow Up (To Be a Man)" was written and composed by Brian Wilson with additional lyrics by Mike Love. At the time, Brian told the Birmingham Post, "When I was younger, I used to worry about turning into an old square over the years. I don't think I will now, and that is what inspired 'When I Grow Up'." In a 2011 interview, he commented that when he wrote the song, he had a dismal view of his future. In his 2016 memoir, Love wrote that the song was "probably influenced" by Murry Wilson, who constantly challenged Brian's manhood. Wilson later revisited the topic of manhood in the 1966 song "Child Is Father of the Man".

Lyrics
The lyrics describe a boy who is anxious of when he stops being a teenager. To this effect, the narrator poses such question as "Will I love my wife for the rest of my life?" That line in particular marked the first instance of a Beach Boys song discussing falling out of love with someone, as opposed to just being in or out of a relationship. Academic Jody O'Regan interpreted the line as Wilson admitting that he had doubts about his marriage.

Critic Richard Meltzer later cited "When I Grow Up" as the moment when the Beach Boys "abruptly ceased to be boys". It is one of the first rock songs to discuss impending adulthood and is possibly the earliest US top 40 song to contain the expression "turn on" (from the lyric "Will I dig the same things that turned me on as a kid?").

Composition
"When I Grow Up" features multiple key changes, a hook based on a dissonant, functionally ambiguous chord, tempo stretches, and a long pause as a climax. Music historian Charles Granata wrote that the song "best exemplifies the [band's] musical growth" through its "effective combination of odd sounds" and its "full and round" vocal harmonies.

O'Regan afforded attention to the drum pattern for avoiding a traditional backbeat rhythm. Instead, it "effectively plays 'around' the vocals with interesting fills adding texture and drama to the passing of time in the lyrics. Each part of the drum kit works independently from each other, horizontally as four separate parts, rather than a whole set working together."

Recording
The track was recorded over two sessions in 1964 at Western Studio. The instrumental track was most likely recorded on August 5 with the vocals being overdubbed on August 10. With the exception of the harmonica in the verses, all the instruments were played by the group members themselves. It took 37 takes to record.  Wilson later expressed disappointment with his vocal, saying that the group were trying to sound like the Four Freshmen, but his voice was too "whiney".

Release
On August 24, 1964, "When I Grow Up (To Be a Man)" was issued as a single, backed with "She Knows Me Too Well", and later peaked at number 9 in the US and number 27 in the UK. It also spent two weeks at number one in Canada's national RPM chart.

In the UK, the single was issued on October 23. During the band's first British tour in November 1964, they performed this song for their first television appearances in Britain, on Discs a Go Go, The Beat Room, Top Gear, and Ready Steady Go!.

Cash Box described it as being in "jumpin' rhythmic manner that has made [the Beach Boys] such big teen favorites."

Personnel
Surviving sessions audio and AFM musician contracts sheets, documented by Craig Slowinski have enabled this personnel list to be compiled.

The Beach Boys
Al Jardine – electric bass guitar, harmony and background vocals
Mike Love – lead vocals, harmony and background vocals
Brian Wilson – acoustic upright piano, Baldwin electric harpsichord, lead vocals, harmony and background vocals
Carl Wilson – electric lead and rhythm guitars, harmony and background vocals
Dennis Wilson – drums, hi-hat, harmony and background vocals

Session musician
Carrol Lewis – double-reed harmonica

Charts

References 
Citations

Bibliography

External links 
 
 

Songs about teenagers
1964 singles
The Beach Boys songs
Songs written by Brian Wilson
Songs written by Mike Love
RPM Top Singles number-one singles
Song recordings produced by Brian Wilson
Capitol Records singles
1964 songs